Attelabus auratus is a species of leaf and bud weevils belonging to the family Attelabidae.

Description
These weevils have a golden yellow coloration. Surface of thorax is  finely rugose, with an angulated impression extending across the middle. Rostrum is quite short.

Distribution
This species is present in Central America.

References
 Bisby F.A., Roskov Y.R., Orrell T.M., Nicolson D., Paglinawan L.E., Bailly N., Kirk P.M., Bourgoin T., Baillargeon G., Ouvrard D. (red.) (2011)   Catalogue of Life
 Biologia Centrali-Americana
 Inotaxa

Attelabidae
Beetles described in 1889